Skin Bracer is an aftershave lotion first launched by Mennen in 1931, and now manufactured by Colgate-Palmolive since its purchase of Mennen in 1992. Two variants of Skin Bracer, Cooling Blue and Cool Spice were once sold but are now discontinued.

References

Colgate-Palmolive brands